Jessy Kimbangi, better known by his stage name Jessy Matador, is a French-Congolese singer.

Biography

Matador began his career as a dancer in 2001. He later joined the group "Les cœurs brisés" (The Broken Hearts) with whom he toured the United States, Democratic Republic of the Congo, the United Kingdom, Italy and Canada. In 2005, he decided to create his own group called "La Sélésao" composed of members Dr. Love, Linho and Benkoff. The same members also formed the first edition of the group Magic System. In late 2007, they signed with Oyas Records before signing with Wagram Records in spring 2008.

They released their début single "Décalé Gwada" in June 2008, becoming one of the hits of that summer. On 24 November 2008 the group released the album Afrikan New Style, a musical hybrid of African and Caribbean influences with more urban sounds. The style includes influences of zouk, dancehall, reggae, hip hop, Coupé-Décalé, ndombolo and kuduro. In December 2008, they released their second single "Mini Kawoulé".

Eurovision Song Contest 2010
On 19 February 2010, it was announced by France Télévisions that Matador would represent France in the Eurovision Song Contest 2010, to be held on 29 May 2010 in Oslo, Norway with the song "Allez Ola Olé". Jessy Matador placed 12th in the final, which was one of France's better results in the 2000s.

Discography

Albums

Singles

As featured artist

Other singles

Notes
1 Digital Download

References

External links

Eurovision Song Contest entrants of 2010
Eurovision Song Contest entrants for France
People from Kinshasa
Democratic Republic of the Congo emigrants to France
Living people
21st-century Democratic Republic of the Congo male singers
21st-century French male singers
Soukous musicians
Year of birth missing (living people)